Michael Patrick O'Connor (1950, Lackawanna, New York – June 16, 2007, Silver Spring, Maryland) was an American scholar of the Ancient Near East and a poet.  With the field of ANE studies he was a linguist of Semitic languages, with a focus on biblical Hebrew and biblical poetry.

O'Connor received his bachelor's degree in English from the University of Notre Dame in 1970, and a Masters in creative writing from the University of British Columbia in 1972, followed by a Masters in ancient Near Eastern studies (1974) and doctorate in 1978 at the University of Michigan.

After working as a freelance scholar for a number of years, he taught at Saint Paul Seminary School of Divinity of the University of St. Thomas then at Union Theological Seminary.

He is best known from his book on the structure of Hebrew verse and his co-authorship of a textbook on biblical Hebrew syntax.  He proposed that the metre of Hebrew verse was based on constraints in syntax, rather than feet.

He published poems throughout his career, including a book of poetry called Pandary in 1989.

O'Connor was a Catholic, he died of complications of liver cancer on June 16, 2007, at Holy Cross Hospital in Silver Spring, MD.

Selected publications
Books
 The 2nd Edition was printed with a new afterword: 

Edited books
 
  Note: Includes essays originally published in Michigan Quarterly Review XXII (3). Summer 1983, a special issue called The Bible and Its Traditions.

Papers
 
 

 
 
 
 
 
 
 

 (Table of contents with abstracts)

 
 

Reviews
 
 
 
 
 
 

Poetry

References

1950 births
2007 deaths
Historians of antiquity
American Assyriologists
Linguists from the United States
University of Notre Dame alumni
University of British Columbia alumni
University of Michigan alumni
American Roman Catholics
20th-century linguists
Assyriologists